Petra Vítková (born 18 August 1979) is a Czech handballer for Baník Most and the Czech national team.

References

1979 births
Living people
Czech female handball players
Sportspeople from Prague